Andrew Kent Kingston is editor of the Signs of the Times (Australian magazine), a former presenter and producer of the Record InFocus Christian news magazine TV program (2009–2015), and assistant editor of RECORD, the official news magazine of the Seventh-day Adventist Church.

Education 

Kingston holds a Bachelor of Social Work, First Class Honours, from the University of South Australia, which he obtained in 1996. In 2009, Kingston earned a Graduate Diploma of Ministry from Avondale College where he focused on the practicalities of evangelism and church ministry. Also in 2009, Kingston completed a Bachelor of Arts (Communications) from Avondale College. He focused on broadcast media, developing his strengths in writing and technical aspects of the profession such as videography, sound recording and editing. Avondale College awarded him a Bachelor of Arts prize.

Career 

Kingston began his career in the field of social work focusing on youth and families and then transitioned to the criminal justice system where he worked as a probation and parole officer and facilitated the participation of Aboriginal elders in local magistrates courts.

After beginning his studies in communications and media, he undertook a six-month internship as a video production assistant for Adventist Media Network. During this time, he participated in the development and production of the Record InFocus newsmagazine and lifestyle program. He received the Adventist World Radio (AWR) Award of Excellence in Radio Production and Public Relations.

After his internship finished, Kingston continued to volunteer as script consultant for InFocus. In 2009, he was employed as assistant editor for Adventist Record magazine, a role which included production of InFocus. From early 2013, he also began to host the program. The Record InFocus program returned regularly to themes of religious freedom, Christian persecution, spiritual growth and the health benefits of a plant-based diet.

In his role as producer of InFocus, Kingston organised interviews with notable personalities including Paul Colman Trio, Geoff Bullock, "machine gun preacher" Sam Childers, and cricketer Brett Lee. In his role as host, he has interviewed well-known Christians and other public figures, including international motivational speaker Nick Vujicic, "Blue Zone" researcher Dan Buettner, photographer Ken Duncan, "Rabbi to America" Shmuley Boteach, and US presidential hopeful Dr. Ben Carson.

Personal life 

Kent Kingston is a committed Seventh-day Adventist. He is married with two teenage sons.

Publications 

Outside the Square: Male Survivors of Domestic Violence (1996), Honours thesis, University of South Australia.

Kingston writes regularly in his role as editor for Signs of the Times  and Adventist Record  the official magazine of the Seventh-day Adventist Church in the South Pacific region.

References

Living people
Australian television personalities
University of South Australia alumni
Year of birth missing (living people)
Australian Seventh-day Adventists